Ambigolimax is a genus of air-breathing land slugs in the family Limacidae, the keelback slugs. There is still ongoing disagreement whether it is more appropriate to consider Ambigolimax as merely a subgenus of Lehmannia; the evidence for splitting them is phylogenetic trees constructed on the basis of DNA sequences.

Species 
The species in the genus are:

 Ambigolimax valentianus (Férussac, 1821) – Valencia slug, threeband garden slug
 Ambigolimax parvipenis Hutchinson, Reise & Schlitt, 2022
 Ambigolimax waterstoni Hutchinson, Reise & Schlitt, 2022

These species are not reliably distinguishable on the basis of external characters, so identification requires either dissection to reveal the genitalia or DNA sequencing. All three are invasive in various parts of the world.

In addition, Lehmannia melitensis is treated as a species of Ambigolimax by Hutchinson et al. (2022) based on similarity of DNA sequences.
 
Previous usage of the name Ambigolimax nyctelius has now been shown to refer to several species that had been confused: A. parvipenis, A. waterstoni, and Lehmannia carpatica. Furthermore, the species name nyctelius actually refers to a species of Letourneuxia (family Arionidae).

Taxonomic history

Ambigolimax was constructed by Pollonera in 1887 to encompass A. valentianus and what he called A. fulvus but is now understood to be Malacolimax tenellus. He considered Ambigolimax as a subgenus of Agriolimax (now Deroceras) in the family Agriolimacidae. In 1926, Hesse transferred it to become a subgenus of Lehmannia in the family Limacidae. Since about 2007 the increasing tendency has been to split Lehmannia s.l. into two genera, Lehmannia s.s. and Ambigolimax. This splitting was based on genetic evidence that the position of Malacolimax in the phylogenetic tree makes Lehmannia s.l. a paraphyletic group.

References

 
Gastropod genera